Micrargus is a genus of dwarf spiders that was first described by Friedrich Dahl in 1886.

Species
 it contains seventeen species:
Micrargus aleuticus Holm, 1960 – USA (Alaska)
Micrargus alpinus Relys & Weiss, 1997 – Germany, Switzerland, Austria
Micrargus apertus (O. Pickard-Cambridge, 1871) – Europe, Japan
Micrargus cavernicola Wunderlich, 1995 – Japan
Micrargus cupidon (Simon, 1913) – France
Micrargus dilutus (Denis, 1948) – France
Micrargus dissimilis Denis, 1950 – France
Micrargus fuscipalpis (Denis, 1962) – Uganda
Micrargus georgescuae Millidge, 1976 – Europe
Micrargus herbigradus (Blackwall, 1854) (type) – Europe, North Africa, Turkey, Caucasus, Russia to Kazakhstan, China, Japan
Micrargus hokkaidoensis Wunderlich, 1995 – Japan
Micrargus laudatus (O. Pickard-Cambridge, 1881) – Europe
Micrargus longitarsus (Emerton, 1882) – USA, Canada
Micrargus nibeoventris (Komatsu, 1942) – Japan
Micrargus parvus Wunderlich, 2011 – Canary Is.
Micrargus pervicax (Denis, 1947) – France, possibly Austria
Micrargus subaequalis (Westring, 1851) – Europe, Turkey, Caucasus, Russia to Kazakhstan, China

See also
 List of Linyphiidae species (I–P)

References

Araneomorphae genera
Linyphiidae
Spiders of Africa
Spiders of Asia
Spiders of North America
Taxa named by Friedrich Dahl